Pascal Plante is a Canadian film director and screenwriter from Quebec, whose debut feature film, Fake Tattoos (Les faux tatouages), premiered in 2017.

He won the Vancouver Film Critics Circle award for Best Canadian Screenplay at the Vancouver Film Critics Circle Awards 2017, and the film's lead actress Rose-Marie Perreault received a Prix Iris nomination for Revelation of the Year at the 20th Quebec Cinema Awards in 2018, and a Canadian Screen Award nomination for Best Actress at the 7th Canadian Screen Awards in 2019.

His second feature film Nadia, Butterfly was announced as an official selection of the 2020 Cannes Film Festival.

Plante is a former competitive swimmer who tried out, but did not qualify, to represent Canada at the 2008 Summer Olympics, and subsequently studied film at Concordia University's Mel Hoppenheim School of Cinema.

He has also directed the short films La fleur de l'âge, Je suis un château de sable qui attend la mer, Baby Blues, Drum de marde!, Blue-Eyed Blonde, Nonna and Blast Beat, and has worked as a sound mixer and editor on other film projects.

References

External links

21st-century Canadian screenwriters
21st-century Canadian male writers
Canadian male screenwriters
Canadian screenwriters in French
Film directors from Quebec
Writers from Quebec
French Quebecers
Living people
Concordia University alumni
Year of birth missing (living people)